Herschel Mayall (July 12, 1863 – June 10, 1941) was an American stage and film actor of the silent era. He appeared in more than 110 films between 1912 and 1935.

Biography
He was born in Bowling Green, Kentucky, and died in Detroit, Michigan from a cerebral hemorrhage. Mayall was the son of James H. Mayall and Merilla L. Mayall.

Mayall acted on stage, joining the Pike Opera House Company in Cincinnati, Ohio, in 1897 and staying there until the theater burned in 1902, He returned to Cincinnati in 1905 to join the Forepaugh Stock Company and acted with that group for three seasons. In 1906, he was "considered 'Frisco's most popular actor" when the 1906 San Francisco earthquake closed the Alhambra theater, where he had been performing. He and a group of other actors from that theater formed a company that began performing in cities that included Salt Lake City and Reno, Nevada. On Broadway, Mayall portrayed Father Roubier in The Garden of Allah (1911) and Laertes in Hamlet (1912). He also directed Deep Channels (1929) on Broadway.

Filmography

References

External links

1863 births
1941 deaths
American male film actors
American male silent film actors
Male actors from Kentucky
20th-century American male actors
American male stage actors
Broadway theatre people